Imagine Dragons is the eponymous second extended play (EP) by the American pop rock band of the same name, released on August 24, 2009.  It was recorded at Battle Born Studios.  All songs were written and produced by Imagine Dragons.  Engineering was done by Robert Root.  Tracks from the EP featured on Windows Media Player after the band won a competition on Reverbnation. The track "I Need a Minute" cracked the CMJ Radio 200. "Cover Up" appears on various deluxe editions of the band's debut album Night Visions.

On October 15, 2021, the EP was re-released onto streaming platforms with the previously unreleased bonus track "Hole Inside Our Chests".

Release
On June 26, 2009 the band released the first song "Uptight" on MySpace. On July 24th, they released two songs "I Need A Minute" and "Cover Up".

On October 15, 2021, the EP was re-released onto streaming platforms with the previously unreleased bonus track "Hole Inside Our Chests".

Cover art
The album art is an autostereogram, which features a dragon facing to the right.

Film and television
"I Need a Minute" was featured on MTV's The Real World: San Diego.
"Cover Up" was featured in commercials for MLS' Real Salt Lake.
"Cover Up" was also featured in commercials for BYUtv's indie music show AUDIO-FILES.

Track listing

Personnel
 Dan Reynolds: lead vocals
 Wayne Sermon: guitar
 Ben McKee: bass guitar
 Andrew Tolman: drums
 Brittany Tolman: keyboard, backing vocals

Critical reaction
Jason Bracelin, writing in the Las Vegas Review-Journal, described the EP by stating "Upon taking in this bunch's new EP you get the sense that they could probably turn the recitation of the ingredients to a bottle of Prell into an arms-in-the-air anthem.  With outsized synth lines, ringing, perpetually cresting guitars and massive syncopated beats and cymbal splashes, Imagine Dragons don't make any bones about believing that bigger is always better... it'll only be a matter of time before a song like "Curse" is all over the radio."

References

2009 debut EPs
Imagine Dragons EPs
Self-released EPs